Jacob Leroux (1737–1799) was an architect who created housing and other speculative developments.  These included Somers Town which was created on land leased from Lord Somers adjacent to the New Road.  This had a polygonal layout inside the circle of a carriage road – a design which he had first tried in Southampton.

References

1737 births
1799 deaths
18th-century English architects